The Poarta is a right tributary of the river Turcu in Romania. Its source is in the Bucegi Mountains. It flows into the Turcu in Bran.

References

Rivers of Romania
Rivers of Brașov County